Abdullah Mohammed Musa Madu (born 15 July 1993) is a Saudi footballer who currently plays for Al-Nassr and the Saudi Arabia national team.

Career statistics

Club

Honours
Al-Nassr
 Saudi Professional League: 2013–14, 2014–15, 2018–19
 Saudi Crown Prince Cup: 2013–14
 Saudi Super Cup: 2019, 2020

References

External links 
 

1993 births
Living people
Al Nassr FC players
Association football defenders
Footballers at the 2014 Asian Games
Saudi Arabia youth international footballers
Saudi Arabia international footballers
Saudi Professional League players
Saudi Arabian footballers
Asian Games competitors for Saudi Arabia
Sportspeople from Mecca
21st-century Saudi Arabian people
20th-century Saudi Arabian people
2022 FIFA World Cup players